Arnold Line is an unincorporated area and census-designated place (CDP) in Lamar County, Mississippi, United States. As of the 2020 census it had a population of 2,333. It is part of the Hattiesburg Metropolitan Statistical Area.

It is in the northeast part of Lamar County and is bordered to the north, east, and south by the city of Hattiesburg.

Demographics

2020 census

Note: the US Census treats Hispanic/Latino as an ethnic category. This table excludes Latinos from the racial categories and assigns them to a separate category. Hispanics/Latinos can be of any race.

References

Census-designated places in Mississippi
Census-designated places in Lamar County, Mississippi
Hattiesburg metropolitan area